Park Point at RIT (originally referred to as "Collegetown" or "College Park") is a commercial enterprise on the northeast corner of Rochester Institute of Technology's campus in Rochester, New York. The property was initially being leased to Wilmorite Properties, until it was bought by American Campus Communities in 2013. Park Point at RIT is a $72 million dollar project and is expected to bring in $10 million in tax revenue during the first ten years of operation.

Although tenants were allowed to move in and shops began opening on August 15, 2008, the grand opening of Park Point at RIT was held on September 27, 2008, with a concert called Simone Square Bash 2008.

History 
For several years, RIT had been looking for ways to add new housing to campus for students.  As early as October 2003, rumors spread through RIT's student body about expanding an existing complex, or perhaps a new student housing project.

In the Winter of 2005, RIT announced a plan for 'College Town'. College Town was envisioned as "a commercial venture that would bring a variety of shopping, dining and housing to a  parcel on the northeast corner of campus." Initially, the area was designed for use primarily by RIT students and faculty; but as time progressed, the idea of College Town expanded to include not only RIT and other college students, but to also incorporate recent graduates and the local community.

According to a statement from Wilmorite, the firm expects that the housing will largely be taken not only up by students from RIT, but also by students from Monroe Community College, University of Rochester and other area colleges.

Construction 

Although RIT originated the idea for the project, the implementation and operation of Park Point is being carried out by Wilmorite Properties. Wilmorite Construction was responsible for construction of the complex.

Construction of Park Point was originally planned to start in Fall of 2006. However, the project was delayed by concerns about the wetlands in the proposed area. RIT worked with the New York State Department of Environmental Conservation and the United States Army Corps of Engineers to overcome the concerns. RIT created an equal amount of wetlands in the southeast corner of campus to offset the loss of wetlands due to the construction of Park Point.

Construction began on Monday, April 30, 2007 with the clearing of trees and brush in the area, although the official groundbreaking was on June 22.

In addition to the construction at Park Point, the project also caused minor disturbances to local traffic for brief periods of time. These were mostly attributed to bringing utilities to the area as well as the paving of new entrances on John Street and Perkins Road.

Property 
Park Point is situated upon a  plot of RIT's campus. The land, owned by the RIT, was originally intended to be sold to Wilmorite, but RIT instead chose to lease the land to Wilmorite.

The area contains 32 buildings, 31 of which contain apartments. The buildings are divided into three groupings; the block of buildings along Jefferson Road, the block of buildings along John Street, and the buildings around Simone Square at the intersection of the two streets. Simone Square is a small mall, the southwest end of which has a fountain and an open-air stage. All buildings around the square have apartments from the 2nd to the 4th floors, excluding Barnes & Noble.

Slightly west of Park Point is a small Radisson Hotel which is not associated with Park Point.

Barnes & Noble 
The Barnes & Noble Academic Superstore anchors the commercial portion of Park Point, also doubling as RIT's new campus bookstore. The store is two stories tall, totaling half of Park Point's  of commercial floorspace.

When the Barnes & Noble at Park Point opened, the store became the official bookstore of RIT. Campus Connections, the school's old bookstore located in the student alumni building, closed at the same time. However, because these items are not available at Barnes & Noble, the computer and photography departments of Campus Connections remain open, and were renamed the Digital Den.

In addition to the normal assortment of books found at a Barnes & Noble, the store sells all textbooks required for RIT classes. There is also a significant number of additional books relating to subjects in RIT's curriculum, such as computer science and electrical engineering. The store also stocks and sells art supplies and equipment marketed to art and design students in RIT's College of Imaging Arts and Sciences.

The Barnes & Noble at Park Point also sells RIT clothing: RIT t-shirts, jerseys, hoodies and numerous other branded items, dormitory supplies, and minor conveniences. There is also a cafe serving Starbucks products inside the store. There are a few booths in Starbucks itself, and picnic tables can be found around Simone Square.  Since it is a Barnes & Noble Cafe serving Starbucks products, they do not accept Starbucks gift cards, but do accept Barnes and Noble gift cards.

Simone Square 
The focal point of the property is Simone Square, named in honor of Dr. Albert J. Simone. Dr. Simone was RIT's eighth president, and was involved with the project during his presidency. While discussing the College Town project, Simone had said, "We're doing this to increase a sense of community on RIT's campus. That way, students can have a place to release their energies after a hard day on campus and still be together with their classmates and see faculty and staff in a social setting."

The official Grand Opening of Park Point was held on September 27, 2008 in Simone Square with a free concert called Simone Square Bash 2008.

On April 25, 2009, 10fest, a free concert promoting the release of Glacéau Vitamin Water 10 was held in Simone Square. The concert featured a performance by Christina Milian at sunset.

Dining & shopping 
The following shops and restaurants occupy Park Point:
 Barnes & Noble @ RIT, which also doubles as the RIT's campus bookstore
 Lovin' Cup, a full service restaurant, wine bar and music venue
 A fitness center, free for tenants

Housing 
Apartments are leased fully furnished, and are available in 15 different layouts, including: singles, doubles, triples, quadruples, and quintuples. Prices vary from $600 to $1,200 per room per month.

Relations with RIT 
Although RIT created the concept of an RIT CollegeTown, Wilmorite properties was responsible for construction and the operation of Park point; in 2013 Wilmorite Sold the lease to American Campus Communities whom currently manage the facilities. The housing at Park Point is not associated with RIT's own Housing Operations, but is instead conducted by American Campus Communities Additionally, although RIT has its own Public Safety department, Security for Park Point is provided by Allied Universal.

There has also been a small student rally at Park Point over RIT's refusal to issue commuter parking passes to students living at Park Point. RIT students who rent an apartment at Park Point are considered to be 'On-Campus' for purposes of acquiring a parking pass. Therefore, they are ineligible to receive parking passes for the various academic parking lots around campus. A student rally was held in Simone Square in which students peacefully planned a course of action: formal petitioning via RIT's Student Government. RIT acknowledged that parking has become a problem, citing a deficit of nearly 1,100 parking spaces during the fall of 2008. In the meantime, more shuttle bus service to Park Point will be provided, with future emphasis placed on creating, among other parking improvements, additional parking spaces and more bike paths on campus.

Buses from the Rochester Genesee Regional Transportation Authority make stops at Park Point as both campus shuttles and city routes.

See also 
 College town

References

External links

 Park Point at RIT at RocWiki

Rochester Institute of Technology
Macerich
Geography of Rochester, New York